Painting with Light by John Alton is the first book written on cinematography by a major cinematographer.

The book was first published in 1949. The book's primary focus is on light and the many complex ways a camera crew can manipulate it for effect. Although much of the technical information is now obsolete, Alton, who worked on the films noir classics T-Men, He Walked by Night, The Amazing Mr. X, and The Big Combo, explains how lighting, shooting locations, and various camera techniques can be used to create a visual mood in film.

It was reviewed in The Times Literary Supplement no. 4845, (1996): 18

References

External links
 John Alton at Painting With Light

1949 non-fiction books